The Hopetoun Monument is a monument in the Garleton Hills, near Camptoun, East Lothian, Scotland.

History 
The monument was erected in 1824 in memory of John Hope, 4th Earl of Hopetoun (1765–1823). The foundation stone was laid on May 3, 1824. There is an inscription on the monument which states:

The monument is often referred to as the Garleton Monument or the "Galla Monument" by locals, after Garleton Farm on Byres Hill.

Features 

The viewing platform at the top is reached by 132 steps of a dark, narrow, spiral staircase, and offers views of the Firth of Forth and the surrounding countryside. The monument is a category B listed building. A path runs from a small car park at the base of the hill, winding up steeply through wooded slopes, and a corridor of gorse, before coming out onto the open hilltop. The views can be superb: The Firth of Forth and Fife; Edinburgh and the Pentland Hills to the west; and The Lammermuir Hills to the South. On a clear day, it is even possible to glimpse the Cairngorms far away to the North.

A similar monument to the 4th Earl of Hopetoun stands on Mount Hill near Cupar in Fife, and was built in 1826.

See also

List of places in East Lothian
 Skid Hill

References

External links 

Buildings and structures in East Lothian
Monuments and memorials in Scotland
Tourist attractions in East Lothian